L. Ganesan (born 24 April 1934) is an Indian politician. He is a member of the 14th Lok Sabha of India. He represents the Tiruchirappalli constituency of Tamil Nadu and is a member of DMK. He is called "Mozhipor Thalapathi". 

He is the only politician in Tamil Nadu politics since independence represented in Lok Sabha (M.P.), Rajya Sabha (M.P.), Tamil Nadu Legislative Assembly (M.L.A.) and Tamil Nadu Legislative Council ( M.L.C.).

Early life 
He is from Kallar Community of Mukulaththor. 

He graduated with a law degree from M.A M.L in Thiruchi Law College.

In his village Kannadangudi every family had one working government employee since 1930.

His wife was elected Village President, Kannadangudi Panchyat in 2011.

Career 
He joined DMK in law school. He was also imprisoned under the MISA act. He was the chief of the Anti-Hindi Agitation in 1965.

In December 2006, Marumalarchi Dravida Munnetra Kazhagam (MDMK) general secretary Vaiko "temporarily" relieved the party's presidium chairman L. Ganesan and deputy general secretary Gingee N. Ramachandran of all posts and responsibilities for indulging in "anti-party activities". 

In July 2008, he was expelled from the MDMK after voting against the UPA government.

After his service for Chief Minister Karunanidhi, he broke ranks with Kalaignar and other DMK leaders, and along with Vaiko, Gingee Ramachandran, N. Kannappan and Nanjil Sampath, formed MDMK.

References

External links
 Members of Fourteenth Lok Sabha - Parliament of India website

1934 births
Living people
Indian Tamil people
Lok Sabha members from Tamil Nadu
India MPs 2004–2009
Tamil Nadu politicians
Dravida Munnetra Kazhagam politicians
Marumalarchi Dravida Munnetra Kazhagam politicians
People from Thanjavur district